National Highway 160D, commonly referred to as NH 160D is a national highway in India. It is a secondary route of National Highway 60.  NH-160D runs in the state of Maharashtra in India.

Route 
NH160D connects Nandur Shingote, Dighe, Talegaon, Loni and Kolhar in the state of Maharashtra.

Junctions  
 
  Terminal near Nandur Shingote .
  Terminal near Kolhar.

See also 
 List of National Highways in India
 List of National Highways in India by state

References

External links 

 NH 160D on OpenStreetMap

National highways in India
National Highways in Maharashtra